Piccolo Teatro. (meaning Little Theatre), is the name of several theatres:

 Piccolo Teatro (Milan)
 Piccolo Teatro Dell Opera, New York City
 Teatro Piccolo (Rome)
 Piccolo Teatro (Rufina)